Nizhnevartovsky District  is an administrative and municipal district (raion), one of the nine in Khanty-Mansi Autonomous Okrug, Russia. Its administrative center is the city of Nizhnevartovsk (which is not administratively a part of the district). Population: 35,745 (2010 Census);

Administrative and municipal status
Within the framework of administrative divisions, Nizhnevartovsky District is one of the nine in the autonomous okrug. The city of Nizhnevartovsk serves as its administrative center, despite being incorporated separately as a city of okrug significance—an administrative unit with the status equal to that of the districts.

As a municipal division, the district is incorporated as Nizhnevartovsky Municipal District. The city of okrug significance of Nizhnevartovsk is incorporated separately from the district as Nizhnevartovsk Urban Okrug.

Geography
Lake Tormemtor is located in the district. The Ob and its tributary Vatinsky Yogan, as well as the Irtysh, are the main rivers.

References

Notes

Sources

Districts of Khanty-Mansi Autonomous Okrug
